Matveyevskoye is a rural locality (a village) in Sizemskoye Rural Settlement, Sheksninsky District, Vologda Oblast, Russia. The population was 8 as of 2002.

Geography 
Matveyevskoye is located 35 km north of Sheksna (the district's administrative centre) by road. Yakunina Gora is the nearest rural locality.

References 

Rural localities in Sheksninsky District